Commodore Sir John Hayes (bapt. 11 February 1768 – 3 July 1831) was an English officer of the Bombay Marine of the British East India Company.

Hayes was born in Bridekirk, Cumberland, England, the son of Fletcher Hayes and Elizabeth Martin. On 7 December 1781, at age 13, he joined the Bombay Marine as a midshipman on the Bombay. On 6 February 1793, he sailed from Calcutta on a private trading voyage with two chartered ships, the Duke of Clarence of 250 tons (bm) and 14 guns and the Duchess, an armed snow of 100 tons (bm). The goal was to collect nutmeg from New Guinea. However, on passing Timor, due to adverse winds he decided to navigate around the south coast of Australia and resupply with wood and water at Adventure Bay in Tasmania.

He spent some time exploring the area of the River Derwent, unaware that it had already been charted by Antoine Bruni d'Entrecasteaux. He (re)named many geographic features, generally using the names of officers in the East India Company or his shipmates. Some of these names survive to the present day, including the River Derwent itself and Risdon Cove.

Leaving Tasmania on 9 June, he arrived at New Caledonia on 28 June and explored the coast until leaving for New Guinea on 3 July. He was the first European to land on Rossel Island.

He died in the Coco Islands, in the Bay of Bengal, while en route to Calcutta, aged 63. His only son, Captain Fletcher Fulton Compton Hayes, was killed in Awadh during the Indian Rebellion of 1857.

References

1768 births
1831 deaths
British East India Company Marine personnel
British explorers
Explorers of Australia
Knights Bachelor
Royal Navy personnel of the American Revolutionary War
British military personnel of the Third Anglo-Mysore War
Royal Navy personnel of the French Revolutionary Wars
British military personnel of the Fourth Anglo-Mysore War
Royal Navy personnel of the Napoleonic Wars
British military personnel of the First Anglo-Burmese War
People from Bridekirk